Violant of Castile (1265 – 1287/1308) was infanta of Castile and Lady of Biscay on her marriage to Diego López V de Haro. She was the daughter of Alfonso X of Castile, and Violant of Aragon.

Life
She was the daughter of Alfonso X of Castile, and Violant of Aragon. On her father's side, she was the granddaughter of Ferdinand III of Castile, and his first wife, Elisabeth of Swabia. On her mother's side, she was the granddaughter of James I of Aragon, and his second wife, Violant of Hungary. 

Infanta Violant of Castile was born in 1265. In 1272 it was agreed, and a year later confirmed that she would marry King Henry I of Navarre's son and heir apparent, Theobald, which would establish an alliance between Castile and Navarre. The marriage proposal failed with the death of the young Theobald after he fell from a battlement at the castle of Estella in 1273. Later, in 1282, she married Diego López V de Haro, Lord of Biscay. 

Her date of death is unknown, but it must have occurred sometime between 12 March 1287 and 30 January 1308.
After her death, she was buried at the now-destroyed Monasterio de San Francisco de Burgos. In the same monastery was buried later her husband.

Marriage and Issue
In her marriage to Diego López V de Haro, Lord of Biscay, they had four children: 

 Lope Díaz IV de Haro (1285–1322). Señor of Orduña and Valmaseda and Alférez of the king, Ferdinand IV of Castile. Died without descendants.
 Fernando Díaz de Haro. Señor of Orduña and Valmaseda after the death of his brother. Married in 1315 with Maria of Portugal, Lady of Meneses and Orduña, daughter of the infante Alfonso de Portugal and his wife, Violante Manuel, sister of Juan Manuel, Prince of Villena.
 Pedro López de Haro, who died in infancy.
 María Díaz de Haro. Señora of Tordehumos. Married Juan Núñez II de Lara, señor of Lara and Albarracín.

Ancestry

Notes

Bibliography 
 

 

 

 

 

 

 

 

 

 

 

 

 

  

 

1265 births
Year of death uncertain
Castilian infantes
Castilian House of Burgundy
13th-century Castilians
13th-century Spanish women
14th-century Castilians
14th-century Spanish women
Daughters of kings